The following is a list of state awards in Tajikistan. State awards include the orders, decorations, and medals.

Titles

Hero of Tajikistan 
The title of Hero of Tajikistan is the highest state award in Tajikistan, being first awarded in 1996.

People's Writer 
The title of People's Writer is awarded to those who have made advancements in the field of literature. It has been awarded to writers such as Abdumalik Bahori and Jalol Ikrami. It was unveiled on 31 July 2001.

People's Poet 
The title of People's Poet is awarded to those who have made advancements in the field of poetry. Among the notable People's Poets was Zulfiya Atoulloeva (2010), Gulrukhsor Safieva, Aminjan Shokuhi, Mirzo Tursunzoda, Qutbi Kirom, Loiq Sher-Ali and Gulnazar Keldi

Soviet era titles 
 People's Artist of the Tajik SSR

Orders

Order of Ismoili Somoni
The Order of Ismoili Somoni is the highest distinction of the Republic, named after Isma'il ibn Ahmad. Notable recipients include Ahmad Shah Massoud, Vladimir Putin, and Ban Ki-moon.

Order "Star of the President of Tajikistan" 
The Order "Star of the President of Tajikistan" is divided into 3 degrees:

 I degree is awarded to: heads of state, government and parliaments of foreign states.
 II degree is awarded to: ministers, ambassadors and heads of departments of foreign states.
 III degree is awarded to: persons holding leading public positions of the Tajik civil service.
Among those awarded with the order was former Mayor of Dushanbe Mahmadsaid Ubaydulloyev and presidential advisor Ozoda Rahmon.

Order of Friendship 
The Order of Friendship is awarded to statesmen and public figures for their active role in strengthening peace and cooperation between the different ethnicities in Tajikistan.

Order of the Crown 
The Order of Crown (Зарринтоҷ — «Золотая корона») is divided into three grades:

 I degree - The badge of the order is worn on a ribbon over the right shoulder and the star of the order on the left side of the chest.
 II degree - It has a sign that is worn by males on a ribbon around the neck and females on a ribbon bow on the left side of the chest.
 III degree - It has a sign that is worn on a ribbon on the left side of the chest.

Notable awardees include:

 Mahmadsaid Ubaydulloyev - Mayor of Dushanbe from 1996 to 2017 (13 January 2016)
 Xi Jinping - General Secretary of the Chinese Communist Party and President of China (15 June 2019)
 Shukurjon Zuhurov - Chairman of the Assembly of Representatives (2019)
Shavkat Mirziyoyev - President of Uzbekistan (2021)

Other awards 
 Order of Spitamen
 Order of Glory

Medals

Military and security forces
 Medal of Mercy
 Medal of the Valiant Border Guard of Tajikistan
 Medal "For 15 years of Impeccable Service"
 Medal "5 years of the Armed Forces of the Republic of Tajikistan"
 Medal "10 years of the Armed Forces of the Republic of Tajikistan"
 Medal "15 years of the Armed Forces of the Republic of Tajikistan"
 Medal "75 years of the Tajik Militia"
 Medal "80 years of the Tajik Militia"
 Medal "5 Years of the Presidential Guard"

Gallery

References

External links 
 

 
Tajikistani culture